Hypophytala obscura is a butterfly in the family Lycaenidae. It is found on Bioko off the west coast of Africa.

References

Butterflies described in 1916
Poritiinae
Butterflies of Africa